Pieter Hendrik Schoute (21 January 1846, Wormerveer – 18 April 1913, Groningen) was a Dutch mathematician known for his work on regular polytopes and Euclidean geometry.

He started his career as a civil engineer, but became a professor of mathematics at Groningen and published some thirty papers on polytopes between 1878 and his death in 1913. He collaborated with Alicia Boole Stott on describing the sections of the regular 4-polytopes.

In 1886, he became member of the Royal Netherlands Academy of Arts and Sciences.

Citations

References 
 Pieter Hendrik Schoute, Analytical treatment of the polytopes regularly derived from the regular polytopes., 1911, published by J. Muller in Amsterdam, Written in English. - 82 pages

External links 
 
 

19th-century Dutch mathematicians
20th-century Dutch mathematicians
Geometers
1846 births
1923 deaths
Members of the Royal Netherlands Academy of Arts and Sciences
People from Zaanstad
Delft University of Technology alumni